Adam Wiśniewski (born 24 October 1980) is a Polish retired handballer who played for Wisła Płock.

He competed in handball at the 2016 Summer Olympics.

Sporting achievements

State awards
 2015  Silver Cross of Merit

References

External links
 
 
 
  

1980 births
Living people
Polish male handball players
Olympic handball players of Poland
Handball players at the 2016 Summer Olympics
Wisła Płock (handball) players
Sportspeople from Płock